Richard H. Humbert, also known as Richard Humbird, (1835 - 1905) was a carpenter, soldier, minister, merchant and delegate from Darlington County to South Carolina's 1868 Constitutional Convention. He also served multiple terms as a member of the South Carolina House of Representatives. He served in the U.S. Colored Infantry during the American Civil War  and was in a regiment stationed in South Carolina during the conflict.

He was born in Savannah, Georgia.

He served in the South Carolina House of Representatives from 1871 to 1878. He appeared on a Union Republican Ticket (as Richard Humbird) with B. F. Whittemore, Isaac Brockenton, and Jordan Lang. He served in South Carolina's militia.

He was born 1835 in Savannah, Georgia. He had four children.

In 1874 he was elected with J. A. Smith, S. J. Keith, and Alfred Rush.

He is credited with building the St. James A. M. E..Church at 305 Cherry Street in  Abbeville, South Carolina.

References

Date of birth missing
1835 births
Date of death missing
Politicians from Savannah, Georgia
Members of the South Carolina House of Representatives
American carpenters
American merchants
Confederate States Army officers